The Harvard Club of Boston is a private social club located in Boston, Massachusetts. Its membership is open to alumni and associates of Harvard University, Massachusetts Institute of Technology, Yale University, and Fletcher School of Law and Diplomacy at Tufts University. The Back Bay Clubhouse is located in Boston's historic Back Bay neighborhood, at 374 Commonwealth Avenue.

History
The Harvard Club was founded by a group of 22 Harvard alumni in 1908. The original dues were $5.00 per year, and by the end of the year, more than 1,200 members had joined. The first president, Henry Lee Higginson, was also the founder of the Boston Symphony Orchestra. In 1909, the Club established its first scholarships, awarding grants of $200 to local high school students who would be attending Harvard. One of the first recipients of these scholarships, James Bryant Conant, went on to become the 23rd president of Harvard. In 1912–1913, the Club decided to construct a clubhouse, the Back Bay Clubhouse at 374 Commonwealth Avenue. In 1925, eight squash courts were built. During the Great Depression the Club acted as an employment agency, posting a list of positions needed by members who were out of a job. During World War II, cots were placed in these courts and lodging was offered to military officers at the cost of $1.50 per night. In 1971, women, once limited to dining in the women's annex while the men dined in Harvard Hall, were welcomed as full and active members for the first time in the Club's history. In 1976, the Downtown Clubhouse was purchased at One Federal Street, providing a location more convenient to most of Boston's offices. In 2003, the Downtown Clubhouse underwent a $2.5 million renovation. In 2015, a $16 million renovation of the Back Bay Clubhouse was completed, providing members with new dining spaces, a wine room, enhanced function and member spaces, renovated overnight rooms, a new elevator, and upgraded athletics center.

In 2016, after 108 years, the Club welcomed its first female President, Karen Van Winkle, a Harvard College alumna and native of Cambridge, Massachusetts. Ms. Van Winkle's three-year term, ushered in a new era for the organization as it grows and diversifies its membership and enhances its presence in Greater Boston.

In 2016, the Club was named a Platinum Club of America, an award given to only the top 4% of private clubs nationwide. In 2017, Harvard Hall at the Back Bay Clubhouse was named "Best Ballroom" in the city by Boston Magazine. And, in 2018 the Club was named a Platinum Club of the World – the only private city club in New England to achieve this distinction. Today, the Club is a diverse group of about 5,000 members living in 40 countries around the globe.

Famous people to have spoken at the Club include Vice President Dick Cheney, Eleanor Roosevelt, Henry Kissinger, William Taft, Robert Frost, Buckminster Fuller and John Foster Dulles.

Mission Statement
To be the social, intellectual, and athletic hub of Harvard alumni and our affiliated community in the Greater Boston area.

Membership
Alumni from undergraduate and graduate schools of Harvard University are eligible for membership. Alumni from Yale University, The Fletcher School of Diplomacy at Tufts University, and the Massachusetts Institute of Technology are eligible too. Harvard alumni, students and faculty as well as Yale & Fletcher School of Diplomacy alumni are eligible for full Harvard Club memberships. Squash and Fitness memberships are available for an additional fee. Like most private clubs, members of the Harvard Club are given reciprocal benefits at over 140 clubs around the United States and the world.

Back Bay Clubhouse
The Clubhouse's facilities include ClubPub, the Veritas restaurant and lounge, 25 guest rooms, four squash courts, a fitness center, and numerous function rooms, including Harvard Hall, which has hosted events ranging from weddings to corporate events and member-only events. Dress code is business casual for members and guests. Appropriate denim pants (not torn, frayed or excessively worn) are acceptable at the Club.

Higginson 1908 Foundation
The Harvard Club maintains a Foundation, with a separate Board of Directors from the club's Board of Governors, which oversees assets in excess of $10 million. The purpose of the Foundation is to help sustain the Club's mission to support deserving Boston area students, fund historically significant improvements to the Back Bay Clubhouse, preserve and maintain the Club's art collection and in the development of programming that advances the Club and University's reputation. The Foundation also supports the University's undergraduate admissions program by hosting receptions for admitted students, as well as sponsoring the Prize Book program. In 2008, the Foundation donated $510,944 to undergraduate financial aid.

See also
Columbia University Club of New York
Cornell Club of New York
Harvard Club of New York
Harvard Club of Washington DC
List of American gentlemen's clubs
Oxford and Cambridge Club
Penn Club of New York City
Princeton Club of New York
Yale Club of New York City

References 

Organizations based in Boston
Organizations established in 1908
Gentlemen's clubs in the United States
1908 establishments in Massachusetts
Harvard University